Charles Stanley Monck, 4th Viscount Monck  (10 October 1819 – 29 November 1894) was an Irish politician who served as the last governor-general of the Province of Canada and the first Governor General of Canada after Canadian Confederation.

Early life 

Charles Stanley Monck was born in Templemore, Ireland on 10 October 1819, which was part of the United Kingdom of Great Britain and Ireland at the time.  He was the son of Charles Monck, 3rd Viscount Monck, and his wife Bridget née Willington. His paternal grandparents were Charles Monck, 1st Viscount Monck and the former Anne Quin. After his uncle, Henry Monck, 1st Earl of Rathdowne (and 2nd Viscount), died without male heirs (but was father to nine girls), the earldom became extinct and the late earl’s younger brother (Charles Stanley's father Charles) became the 3rd Viscount. His maternal grandparents were John Willington of Killoskehan Castle in Barnane, and the former Bridget Butler (daughter of Theobald Butler of Knocka Castle in Drom).

Career
Monck obtained a law degree from Trinity College, Dublin. He married his cousin Elizabeth Monck in 1844, and in 1849 he inherited his father's title of Viscount Monck. In 1852 he was elected MP for Portsmouth, and from 1855 to 1858 he served as Lord of the Treasury under Lord Palmerston.

Governor General of Canada
In 1861, he was appointed Governor General of British North America as well as Governor of the Province of Canada. Lord and Lady Monck and their children came to Canada, but they did not remain throughout his term of office as Governor General of Canada. The family resided at Spencerwood in Quebec during most of their stay in Canada.

During this time, the Canadian colonies were beginning to organise themselves into a confederation. The American Civil War had just broken out, and the Trent Affair caused diplomatic tension between the United States and Britain. The Canadian government was eager to gain some measure of independence during this turbulent period. The Quebec Conference, the Charlottetown Conference, and the London Conference, at which the details of confederation were discussed, all took place during Monck's time as governor. Monck supported the idea, and worked closely with John A. Macdonald, George Brown, George-Étienne Cartier, and Étienne-Paschal Taché, who formed the "Great Coalition" in 1864.

In 1866, Viscount Monck became a peer with the title Baron Monck. When the Canadian colonies became a semi-independent confederation the next year, Monck became the country's first Governor General. Monck was also responsible for establishing Rideau Hall as the residence of the Governor General in Ottawa.

Later life
In 1869, Monck was succeeded by John Young, 1st Baron Lisgar. He returned home to Ireland, where he became Lord Lieutenant of Dublin in 1874.

Personal life

On 23 June 1844, he married Lady Elizabeth Louise Mary Monck, his first cousin and the daughter of his uncle Henry, the 2nd Viscount, who had been made Earl of Rathdowne in 1822. Together, they were the parents of two sons and two daughters:

 Hon. Frances Mary Monck (d. 1930), who married the Rev. Richard Aslatt Pearce.
 Hon. Elizabeth Louise Mary Monck (d. 1913), who married John Macdonald Royse.
 Henry Power Charles Stanley Monck, 5th Viscount Monck (1849–1927), who married Lady Edith Caroline Sophia Scott, the fourth daughter of John Scott, 3rd Earl of Clonmell, in 1874.
 Hon. Richard Charles Stanley Mountjoy Monck (1858–1892), who married Alice Ann Lymer in 1879.

Lady Monck died in June 1892, aged 78. He died in November 1894, aged 75.

Arms

References

External links 
 
 
 http://www.gg.ca
Photograph: Governor General Monck in 1864. McCord Museum
Photograph: Lord Monck, Governor General in 1866. McCord Museum

1819 births
1894 deaths
Members of the Parliament of the United Kingdom for English constituencies
Members of the Privy Council of the United Kingdom
Members of the Privy Council of Ireland
Governors General of Canada
Governors-General of the Province of Canada
Viscounts in the Peerage of Ireland
Knights Grand Cross of the Order of St Michael and St George
Politicians from County Tipperary
UK MPs 1852–1857
UK MPs who inherited peerages
UK MPs who were granted peerages
Lord-Lieutenants of Dublin
Persons of National Historic Significance (Canada)
Peers of the United Kingdom created by Queen Victoria